Zainab Abdul Amir Khalil Ibrahim is a Bahraini politician and journalist. On December 12, 2018, she was sworn in as a member of the Council of Representatives for the seventh district of the Capital Governorate.

Education
She holds a Master of Arts from Ahlia University, earned with a thesis on assessing press freedom after the National Action Charter of Bahrain.

Career
Abdul Amir worked as a Senior Media Specialist in the Public Relations Department of the Ministry of Works. She also worked as a journalist for the newspaper, Al Ayam.

House of Representatives
She entered politics in the 2014 Bahraini general election, running for the seventh district seat in the Capital Governorate and earning 1092 votes for 16.97% in the first round. She lost the second round to Osama Al-Khaja, earning 1373 votes for 39.60%.

She ran again in the same constituency in the 2018 Bahraini general election, followed by international media. Representatives of Agence France-Presse, Deutsche Presse-Agentur, and Alhurra attended the opening of her election headquarters. In the first round, on November 24, 2018, she won 2,945 votes, enough for 49.20%, just barely requiring a second round on December 1. She defeated Afaf al-Mousawi by winning 3,092 votes for 65.29% in the runoff, the first time in Bahrain that two women competed in final contest.

References

Bahraini journalists
Bahraini women journalists
Bahraini women in politics
21st-century Bahraini women politicians
21st-century Bahraini politicians
Living people
Year of birth missing (living people)